Enterprise is a hamlet in the South Slave Region of the Northwest Territories, Canada, located between Great Slave Lake and the Alberta border on the Hay River.

Enterprise is at an important junction of the Mackenzie Highway and the road to Yellowknife and was established when two service stations were built to take advantage of traffic along these highways. It has since grown to include a weigh station, Winnie's Restaurant, and a motel to accommodate travellers. Most of the remaining commercial region, however, is currently closed for business and looking for buyers.

It is a significant point on the Northwest Territories highway system, as all traffic that heads to the two largest population centres, Yellowknife to the north, and the nearby town of Hay River to the northeast, must pass through. As such, a tourism centre/visitors centre is located right in the heart of town, where the old weigh station used to be.

History 
With the completion of the Mackenzie Highway in 1948 from Grimshaw, Alberta, to Hay River on the shores of Great Slave Lake, a number of new service stops were built along its length. In the winter of 1948/1949, Jack Parnall, a freight operator based in Hay River, opened a service station at the junction of the Mackenzie Highway and the Mills Lake winter road, which connected to the Mills Lake freight staging area on the Mackenzie River below Fort Providence. In the late 1950s, the highway was extended to Yellowknife on the north side of Great Slave Lake, and Enterprise became the important junction. Jerry and Mae Eyford opened a Pacific 66 garage in 1956 and Sammy Petersen built a motel and general store in 1964.  The community is a service centre for travellers and is also the base of operations for GNWT highway maintenance in this region.

Demographics 

At the 2016 Canadian census there were 30 First Nations, 10 Métis and 10 Inuit. The main languages, besides English, are North and South Slavey, Inuinnaqtun (Inuvialuktun) and German.

Incorporation 
In 2007, Enterprise filed a petition to change from settlement status to hamlet, which would allow for greater powers by council, a public voting for mayor, and freedom to set property tax rates. On 27 October 2007 the community was officially incorporated and Allan Flamand became the first mayor.

Climate 
Enterprise has a subarctic climate (Dfc) with the yearly mean temperature being below zero in spite of the relatively warm summers around  resulting in Enterprise being well below the tree line in the boreal forest.

See also
 List of municipalities in the Northwest Territories

Notes

References

Communities in the South Slave Region
Hamlets in the Northwest Territories